Gillian Settlement is an unincorporated community in Johnson County, Arkansas, United States. It is located at  (35.63167, -93.40167) and has an elevation of 1700 feet.

References

Unincorporated communities in Johnson County, Arkansas